David Lukuba (born 17 March 1957) is a Tanzanian sprinter. He competed in the men's 100 metres at the 1980 Summer Olympics.

References

1957 births
Living people
Athletes (track and field) at the 1980 Summer Olympics
Tanzanian male sprinters
Olympic athletes of Tanzania
Athletes (track and field) at the 1978 Commonwealth Games
Athletes (track and field) at the 1982 Commonwealth Games
Commonwealth Games competitors for Tanzania
Place of birth missing (living people)